Azeugmatothrips is a genus of thrips in the family Phlaeothripidae, first described by Laurence Mound and Palmer in 1983. The holotype for A. obrieni was collected in Panama, that for A. rectus in Trinidad.

Species
Listed at GBIF and IRMNG:
 Azeugmatothrips obrieni
 Azeugmatothrips rectus

References

Phlaeothripidae
Thrips
Thrips genera
Taxa named by Laurence Alfred Mound